Anita Garibaldi is a municipality located in the state of Santa Catarina, Brazil. The municipality  covers about 588.612 km² and has 6,957 inhabitants. It is named after Anita Garibaldi, the Brazilian wife and comrade-in-arms of Italian revolutionary Giuseppe Garibaldi.

References

Municipalities in Santa Catarina (state)